Mildred Gordon (1922 – January 4, 2015) was the founder and Executive Director of the Foundation for Feedback Learning (FFL) and co-founder of the Ganas intentional community.  She was the Communications Director of ActivistSolutions.org.

References

1922 births
2015 deaths